Peixoto is a Portuguese surname. Notable people with the surname include:

Alvarenga Peixoto (1743–1793), Brazilian poet, born in Rio de Janeiro
António Augusto de Rocha Peixoto (1866–1909), naturalist, ethnologist and archaeologist
César Peixoto (born 1980), Portuguese footballer who plays for Sport Lisboa e Benfica in the Portuguese first division
Floriano Peixoto (1839–1895), Brazilian soldier and politician, a veteran of the Paraguayan War, second President of Brazil
Floriano Peixoto (actor), known as Floriano Peixoto (born 1959), Brazilian film and television actor from Rio de Janeiro
Floriano Peixoto Vieira Neto, (born 1954), Brazilian Army officer, commander of the United Nations Stabilization Mission in Haiti
Júlio Afrânio Peixoto (1876–1947), Brazilian physician, writer, politician, historian, university president, and eugenicist
José Luís Peixoto (born 1974), Portuguese writer who has written fiction, poetry, drama and lyrics
Kerwin Peixoto (born 1988), professional football defender from Peru
Leonardo Henrique Peixoto dos Santos (born 1977), Brazilian football centre-back
Mário Peixoto (1908–1992), mainly known for his only film Limite, a silent experimental movie filmed in 1930
Maurício Peixoto (1921–2019), Brazilian engineer who pursued a career as a mathematician

See also
Embraer Unidade Gavião Peixoto Airport (IATA: N/A, ICAO: SBGP), a private airport near Gavião Peixoto, São Paulo, Brazil
Floriano Peixoto, Rio Grande do Sul, municipality in the state Rio Grande do Sul, Brazil
Gavião Peixoto, municipality in the state of São Paulo in Brazil
Peixoto's theorem, relating to the properties of smooth flows on surfaces
Peixoto de Azevedo, city located in the state of Mato Grosso, Brazil
Peixoto de Azevedo River, river of Mato Grosso state in western Brazil

Portuguese-language surnames